Anthien is a commune in the Nièvre département in central France.

Population

Sights
The Château de Villemolin (15th, 17th and 19th centuries) was a location for the film 2003 The Mystery of the Yellow Room directed by  Bruno Podalydès.

See also
Communes of the Nièvre department

References

Communes of Nièvre